Jaron Marquis Garrett (born July 8, 1983), better known by his stage name Jaron Marquis or J. Marquis, is an American rapper, actor, entrepreneur and investor based in Los Angeles. He co-founded Dreamapolis, an Indianapolis-based start-up accelerator, and the independent record label Urban Genius Entertainment. As an actor he has starred in film roles that include Furious 7 and Straight Outta Compton.

Early life

Marquis was born in Indianapolis and graduated from Arsenal Technical High School in 2001. He received a bachelor of arts degree with concentrations in business and pastoral sciences from Indiana State University in 2005. Then he moved to Chicago and obtained an MBA from Benedictine University.

From the age of 12, when he made and sold jewelry, Marquis tried various entrepreneurial ideas. He started a theatrical production company at Indiana University. After graduating, he operated an indoor advertising company, started and sold a painting firm, worked in college admissions, and owned part of a telecommunications company.

Music career

Marquis began his rap career as an underground battle rapper in the late 1990s. He booked gigs for his rapper friends at Arsenal Tech High School, where he and his friends would organize and participate in local rap battles around the state of Indiana.

After a decade-long hiatus in which he developed entrepreneurial ventures and investments, Marquis reentered the music industry in 2014 under the name J. Marquis with the release of a mixtape entitled Soul of A Genius. The mixtape included the singles "We All Rant" and "Just Like Water" featuring Lauryn Hill.

In 2016, he began performing and recording under his actual name Jaron Marquis with the release of the single "Applause". Marquis described his music as "college dropout Kanye with a touch of Janelle Monáe."

Business career

Marquis founded a company, JJ Marquis Investment Group LLC, and started doing real estate full-time in 2006. A year later, he made a $30 million project for a 25-story apartment tower to be built on run-down properties in downtown Indianapolis. However, the project never materialized and construction plans were canceled.

He was an OnyxFest finalist in 2012. He directed Betsy on E. 10th Street, a play by the Indianapolis Urban Theatre and Dance Company, a theatrical production company which he co-founded. He also played one of the main roles. The play was praised for drawing its story from the life of a Vietnam veteran and ex-Black Panther.

In 2011, Marquis also co-founded Dreamapolis, an Indianapolis-based start-up accelerator and seed-funding source for start-ups, social entrepreneurs, creatives and innovators. It helped urban entrepreneurs start businesses by connecting them with critical tools and resources. Dreamapolis held entrepreneur workshops and crowdfunding events, organized business summer camps for youth, and invested in creative Indianapolis ideas.

Marquis launched the independent record label Urban Genius Entertainment in 2013 and began recording new music in 2014.

Private life

Marquis is married and has three daughters. He currently lives and works in Los Angeles.

Discography

Singles

Mixtapes

Filmography

References

External links
 

1983 births
Living people
21st-century American male actors
21st-century American male musicians
21st-century American rappers
African-American Christians
African-American dramatists and playwrights
African-American male actors
African-American male rappers
American Christians
American dramatists and playwrights
American male dramatists and playwrights
American male rappers
Benedictine University alumni
Businesspeople from Indianapolis
Indiana State University alumni
Male actors from Indianapolis
Midwest hip hop musicians
Musicians from Indianapolis
Rappers from Indiana
Trinity International University alumni
African-American male writers